The Arthur Kill Bridge was a railroad bridge connecting Staten Island, New York to New Jersey's Chemical Coast by crossing the Arthur Kill. It existed from 1888 until 1959, when it was replaced by the current Arthur Kill Vertical Lift Bridge, built nearby. It was the only land connection to Staten Island until 1928.

Proposal for a bridge
Although a temporary pontoon bridge to Elizabeth, New Jersey was built by the British during the Revolution, Staten Island was usually accessible only by ferry to New Jersey or by private boat. It was not until 1810 that regular ferry service was established to Manhattan.

As early as 1850, campaigns for a bridge to Bayonne, New Jersey were begun by some summer residents of the island, although opposed by many permanent residents. In 1870 the New York State Legislature passed a bill authorizing a swing-span bridge from New Brighton, Staten Island to Ellis Island via Robbins Reef. A charter was granted to the Staten Island Bridge Company, but the project was eventually abandoned due to fiscal constraints.

The proposal to build a railroad bridge over the Arthur Kill existed from at least 1886, when Erastus Wiman, a developer who was founder and president of the Staten Island Railway, persuaded the Baltimore and Ohio Railroad to finance a bridge over the Arthur Kill in exchange for use of Wiman's railroad facilities on the island.

In the summer of 1886 the Board of Army Engineers for Fortifications held a hearing at the Army Building in Manhattan to determine the preferred location for the interstate bridge that had recently been authorized by Congress. Speaking in favor of the bridge were representatives of the Baltimore and Ohio Railroad and Erastus Wiman. Opposed to the proposed location were Senator Chase, representing the Pennsylvania Railroad, and I. L. Fisher of the Bee Towing Company. The Board reported to the Secretary of War.

Description and history

The approved bridge was designed by Charles Ackenheit (or Ackenheil), the chief engineer for the Baltimore and Ohio Railroad. The cost was approximately $500,000. Construction occurred from 1887 to 1889 and the bridge opened with ceremony on January 1, 1890. It was also called the "Achter Kill Bridge" after the alternate spelling and pronunciation of Arthur Kill. At the time of its completion, it was the longest of its type in the world.

It was a swing-span railroad bridge with a center pier, connecting the Howland Hook area of Staten Island to Elizabeth, New Jersey, where tracks could connect with a Baltimore and Ohio branch line. This would necessitate frequent openings, especially in later years after the kill was dredged and numerous ocean-going ships needed to pass through the strait. In 1952, for example, the bridge was required to be open to allow 13,346 ships to pass. The span was moved by two steam-powered engines. In foggy weather a steam whistle would sound twice to indicate the bridge was closed, or four times so boats would know it was open.

The bridge was used for freight trains.  There was never any regular passenger service over the bridge, although during both World War I and World War II, numerous troop trains would deliver soldiers bound for Europe to ships waiting at the Staten Island port of embarkation piers. Also, in October 1957, a train carrying Queen Elizabeth II and Prince Philip from Washington to the Staten Island Ferry during a state visit crossed the bridge.

In late 1952, the swing span was turned by heavy winds and could not be closed for some time. At other times at least one ship crashed into the bridge, and there was at least one case where boats collided while navigating under the bridge. By the 1950s the bridge was considered outdated and a hazard to navigation. The new bridge, financed primarily by the federal government, had a center span  longer than the old bridge, with no center pier, and its clearance was more than  higher than the old span. The new bridge was inaugurated in August 1959, and the Arthur Kill Bridge was then removed; its granite piers had to be blasted away.

References

External links

Railroad bridges in New York City
Railroad bridges in New Jersey
History of Staten Island
Buildings and structures in Elizabeth, New Jersey
Bridges in Staten Island
Bridges in Union County, New Jersey
Swing bridges in the United States
Baltimore and Ohio Railroad bridges
Staten Island Railway